Cestrum aurantiacum (orange cestrum, "orange jessamine", orange-flowering jessamine, and yellow cestrum; syn. Capraria lanceolata L.f.) is native to North and South America. This plant is used as an ornamental plant, and it is a poisonous plant if eaten by animals. It is regarded as medicinal in Peru.

References

aurantiacum
Flora of South America
Garden plants